During the 2007–08 English football season, Brentford competed in Football League Two. With a second-successive relegation looking a possibility, manager Terry Butcher was replaced by his assistant Andy Scott in December 2007 and the club finished the season comfortably in mid-table.

Season summary

In April 2007, with two matches of the 2006–07 season still to play, Terry Butcher was announced as the new Brentford manager. He officially took charge on 7 May of a club newly-relegated to League Two and two days later he installed former Bees player Andy Scott as his assistant, citing the need "to appoint someone who has knowledge of the lower divisions". Aside from a number of released players, the previous season's top scorer Jo Kuffour and regular left back Andy Frampton departed the club and Butcher and Scott brought in goalkeeper Simon Brown, defenders John Mackie and Craig Pead, midfielders Gary Smith and Glenn Poole and forwards Alan Connell and Lee Thorpe on free transfers, in addition to five loanees to cover for lack of numbers in the squad. Despite Brentford supporter Matthew Benham spending £3,000,000 in January 2007 to take over the club's loans from previous chairman Ron Noades' company Altonwood, the management team would be forced to work to a tight budget during the 2007–08 season.

Two wins from the opening four matches of the season put Brentford into the play-off places, though it would prove to be a false dawn. Five defeats from six matches in September and October dropped the Bees down to 17th and five consecutive defeats in November without scoring a goal led Butcher to leave Griffin Park by mutual consent on 11 December. Andy Scott took over as caretaker manager and immediately galvanised the team, with 8 wins from his first 12 matches lifting Brentford from 19th to 11th. Scott was given the job on a permanent basis on 4 January 2008 and in a bid to reduce the average age of the squad, he released seven players and signed left back Ryan Dickson and striker Nathan Elder on permanent deals. Scott would loan eight players between January and the end of the season, to cover for injuries to Kevin O'Connor, Simon Brown, Matthew Heywood, John Mousinho and for loanees who had returned to their clubs. The team stalled in the final months of the season and lost 10 of the last 15 matches to finish in 14th place.

League table

Results
Brentford's goal tally listed first.

Legend

Pre-season

Football League Two

FA Cup

Football League Cup

Football League Trophy

 Sources: Soccerbase, 11v11

Playing squad 
Players' ages are as of the opening day of the 2007–08 season.

 Source: Soccerbase

Coaching staff

Terry Butcher (11 August – 11 December 2007)

Andy Scott (11 December 2007 – 3 May 2008)

Statistics

Appearances and goals
Substitute appearances in brackets.

 Players listed in italics left the club mid-season.
 Source: Soccerbase

Goalscorers 

 Players listed in italics left the club mid-season.
 Source: Soccerbase

Discipline

 Players listed in italics left the club mid-season.
 Source: ESPN FC

Management

Summary

Transfers & loans

Kit

|
|

Awards 
 Supporters' Player of the Year: Matthew Heywood
 Football League Two PFA Team of the Year: Craig Pead
 Football League Family Excellence Award

References

Brentford F.C. seasons
Brentford